Fernando Mario Chávez Ruvalcaba (30 November 1932 – 15 September 2021) was a Mexican Roman Catholic prelate. He was bishop of Zacatecas from 1999 to 2008. He died due to complications of COVID-19.

References 

1932 births
2021 deaths
People from Zacatecas
Mexican Roman Catholic bishops
20th-century Roman Catholic bishops in Mexico 
21st-century Roman Catholic bishops in Mexico
Deaths from the COVID-19 pandemic in Mexico